Jacques de Taxi (fl. 1269–1285) was ad interim Grand Master of the Knights Hospitaller, serving in 1285 and was the successor to Nicolas Lorgne. De Taxi was appointed as acting leader of the Order prior to the arrival of Jean de Villiers in the Holy Land.

Biography

Jacques de Taxi was born in Cornello dei Tasso, in the municipality of Camerata Cornello, in the Bremba Valley in Lombardy, and belonged to the family that later gave rise to the Thurns and Taxis.

The name of Jacques de Taxi appears for the first time as a knight of the Order of St. John of Jerusalem at Acre in 1266. De Taxi was appointed Prior of Messina by the Grand Master Hugues de Revel on 3 July 1269. While pope Clement IV had asked the Hospitallers of Sicily, as early as October 1267, to help Charles I of Anjou, the last son of Louis VIII of France, in his struggle to establish himself as king, it was de Taxi who asked Charles in September 1269 to protect the Hospitallers and their property. The king of Naples and Sicily asked his officers to do so. In June 1272, Charles confirmed to de Taxi that the Hospitallers had the right to graze and water their horses on Crown lands and to collect wood, exempting them from taxes.

In service to the king of Sicily
Because of the good relations maintained between Charles I of Anjou and Jacques de Taxi, pope Gregory X delegated the Prior of Sicily, on 16 December 1271, to the king of Sicily. De Taxi received the functions of adviser to the king and officer of his army, but he mainly fulfilled the functions of treasurer of the king. He also put the fleet of the Order at the disposal of the king. On 18 April 1273, he sold the king a new galley, ready to sail, for 100 ounces of gold. In 1270, Charles I had appointed Giovanni da Lentini, Captain General of War for the whole of Sicily, with Foulques de Puyricard and Jacques de Taxi as deputies. Their mission was to suppress the persistent  Swabian rebellion against the Angevin government. Jacques de Taxi received the surrender of the castle of Reggio Calabria from the hands of the partisans of Conradin. In September 1272, Charles I of Anjou formed an embassy composed of the jurist Robert l'Enfant, Matteo de Riso of Messina and Nicolò de Ebdemonia of Palermo in order to intervene with Muhammad I al-Mustansir, the sultan of Tunis and a vassal of the Kingdom of Sicily, to collect the tribute that the sultan owed . He added to this embassy men of confidence like Giovanni da Lentini and Jacques de Taxi. He asked the latter to return to Sicily the wood of the engines of war left in Tunisia when the crusader armies returned to Sicily after the Eighth Crusade. Charles asked de Taxi to come and join him in Foggia to discuss the latest news from the Holy Land. Charles intervened with the Grand Master in favor of Jacques de Taxi who was named prior of the Grand Priory of Barletta on 20 January 1278, replacing Pierre d'Avignon. He held this position until 6 July 1281.

Grand Commander of the Order

Jacques de Taxi regularly intervened with Charles I of Anjou to obtain authorization to transfer from Sicily relief to the Holy Land and to provide all the products and equipment that the Hospitallers needed there. When, in July 1281, de Taxi returned to the Holy Land at Acre at the request of the Grand Master Nicolas Lorgne to take up the post of Grand Commander. He was authorized to take "2,000 salms of wheat, 1,000 of barley and 300 of legumes, as well as 100 mounts (40 mules and 60 horses) [...] the bread necessary for his own and his family's nourishment, as well as the barley indispensable for the nourishment of the mounts during the journey."

Transition
In September 1285, Jean de Villiers was elected Grand Master after the death of Nicolas Lorgne. De Villiers, who had been Prior of France since 1282, remained in France to deal with the many problems of the Order. It was then Jacques de Taxi, as Grand Commander, who became Lieutenant ad interim of the Grand Master, perhaps through 27 June 1286, while awaiting the arrival of the Grand Master in the Holy Land.

See also
 Cartulaire général de l'Ordre des Hospitaliers
 List of Knights Hospitaller sites
 Langue (Knights Hospitaller)
 Flags of the Knights Hospitaller

References

Bibliography

External links
Jacques de Taxi. French Wikipedia.
Liste des grands maîtres de l'ordre de Saint-Jean de Jérusalem. French Wikipedia.
Eugène Harot, Essai d’armorial des Grands-Maîtres de l’Ordre de Saint Jean de Jérusalem.
Seals of the Grand Masters. Museum of the Order of St John.
Charles Moeller, Hospitallers of St. John of Jerusalem. Catholic Encyclopedia (1910). 7. New York: Robert Appleton Company.
Knights of the Order of the Hospital of St John of Jerusalem, Encyclopædia Britannica. 24. (11th ed.). Cambridge University Press. pp. 12–19.

Knights Hospitaller
Grand Masters of the Knights Hospitaller
13th-century French people